The Ashok Group is a division of India Tourism Development Corporation which is a central public sector undertaking, under the ownership of Ministry of Tourism, Government of India. It is headquartered in New Delhi. It is the second largest central government-owned-hospitality service provider in India.

Division
 The Ashok, Delhi
 Samrat Hotel, Delhi
 Hotel Kalinga Ashok, Bhubaneswar
Hotel Pondicherry Ashok, Pondicherry
Hotel Nilanchanl Ashok, Puri (Hotel Closed)

References 

Companies based in New Delhi
Government-owned companies of India
Hotel chains in India
Indian companies established in 1956
1956 establishments in Delhi
Hospitality companies established in 1956

External links 

 Ashok Group
 Hotel Kalinga Ashok